The Lake of the Woods is a backcountry glacial lake in the Desolation Wilderness of the Eldorado National Forest, southwest of Lake Tahoe, in El Dorado County, California. It lies just southeast of Lake Aloha.

The lake is accessible by hiking west out of the Glen Alpine Springs Trailhead, Echo Lake (California) Trailhead or north out of the Twin Bridges Trailhead. The lake is known to contain Rainbow Trout and Brook Trout.

See also 
 List of lakes in California

References 
 

Lakes of the Desolation Wilderness
Lakes of the Sierra Nevada (United States)
Lakes of El Dorado County, California
Glacial lakes of the United States
Eldorado National Forest
Lakes of California
Lake Tahoe
Lakes of Northern California